Ellyn Hefner is an American politician who has served as the Oklahoma House of Representatives member from the 87th district since November 16, 2022.

Career
Hefner worked as a lobbyist for disability rights for adults and children with developmental disabilities for eighteen years.

As of 2022, she also worked as  a financial advisor at Mass Mutual.

Oklahoma House of Representatives
Hefner announced her campaign for the Oklahoma House of Representatives's 87th district in 2022 to succeed retiring Representative Collin Walke. She was the sole Democratic candidate and did not have a primary. She was endorsed by the Edmond Democratic Women chapter. She faced Republican Gloria Banister in the November election. She won the November election and was sworn in on November 16, 2022.

Personal life
Hefner is a widow with three children.

References

21st-century American politicians
Activists from Oklahoma
Disability rights activists
Living people
Democratic Party members of the Oklahoma House of Representatives
Women state legislators in Oklahoma
21st-century American women politicians
Year of birth missing (living people)